Joris Ponse (March 1723, Dordrecht - December 1783, Dordrecht) was a Dutch painter primarily of birds, fruit, and flowers.

Ponse was a scholar of Aert Schouman. He passed through many vicissitudes, being at one time reduced to gain a livelihood by house-painting. In middle life he was established at Amsterdam, where he had some pupils, among them Arie Lamme. His pictures are very scarce.

References
Joris Ponse at the RKD

Attribution:
 

1723 births
1783 deaths
18th-century Dutch painters
18th-century Dutch male artists
Dutch male painters
Artists from Dordrecht
Dutch still life painters